Cyklon was a German make of car produced from 1902 to 1931.  It was primarily noted for its unique three-wheeled design.

Three-wheelers 

The three-wheeled Cyklon Cyklonette was made for 1902. It was a three-wheeler with a single wheel in the front to steer, and to provide propulsion from a 450 cc one-cylinder engine mounted directly above it. This made the Cyklonette one of the earliest front-wheel drive cars. Later models were equipped with a 1.3 L two-cylinder engine producing , though some had a straight-four. The Cyklonette was available until 1923, well after three-wheelers had vanished from the mainstream.

Four-wheelers 
The Cyklon Schebera was available for 1920 and sported a 1.2 L straight-four and was front-engined with rear-wheel drive.  The updated Cyklon 9/40 was released in 1926, with a six-cylinder engine displacing 2.3 L.  All Cyklon models were hit hard by the Great Depression.  Sales were sluggish in the final years, and the company went out of business in 1931.

See also 
Cyklonetka

References

External links 
 Motorbase entry on Cyklon

1900s cars
1910s cars
1920s cars
1930s cars
Defunct motor vehicle manufacturers of Germany
Three-wheeled motor vehicles